is a Japanese footballer who plays for Ehime FC from 2023. His regular playing position is as a left full-back.

Career

After graduating from Sagami Senior High School, Yamaguchi signed for Gamba Osaka ahead of the 2018 J1 League season and was handed the number 35 jersey.   He debuted for Gamba's Under-23 side in week 2 of the 2018 J3 League, coming on as a 73rd-minute substitute for Reo Takae in a 4-1 defeat away to Kagoshima United.   

In total he played 31 out of 32 league games, starting in 29 of them to help his side to 6th place in the final standings.   He didn't make any appearances for Gamba Osaka's senior side during his debut season, but he did make the substitutes bench on 2 occasions during the 2018 J.League Cup without making it onto the playing field.

In 1 December 2022, Yamaguchi officially transfer to J3 club, Ehime FC from Tokyo Verdy for upcoming 2023 season.

Career statistics

.

Reserves performance

Last Updated: 16 December 2020

References

External links

2000 births
Living people
Association football people from Kanagawa Prefecture
People from Yokohama
Japanese footballers
J1 League players
J2 League players
J3 League players
Gamba Osaka players
Gamba Osaka U-23 players
Tokyo Verdy players
Ehime FC players
Association football defenders